Georgie Elmer Denbrough is a fictional character created by Stephen King from his 1986 epic horror novel It. Georgie is the younger brother of Bill Denbrough, and falls prey to Pennywise the Clown. He is used by Pennywise to taunt Bill throughout the novel. Georgie is portrayed by Tony Dakota in the 1990 TV miniseries adaptation and by Jackson Robert Scott in the theatrical film series. Dakota also reprised his role for a 2019 short fan film based on the 1990 TV miniseries adaptation of the novel, titled Georgie, which shows a "What If" scenario if Georgie had survived his encounter with Pennywise.

Fictional character biography
Georgie Elmer Denbrough (also known as "Georgie") was born on September 18, 1951 (1954 in the 1990 TV miniseries and 1981 in the 2017 theatrical film adaptation) to Zack and Sharon Denbrough and is the younger brother of Bill Denbrough. Georgie has a very positive relationship with his older brother, considering him to be his best friend.

Encounter with Pennywise
On one October night in 1957 (1960 in the 1990 TV miniseries and 1988 in the theatrical film series), Georgie makes a paper boat with his older brother on a rainy day. Bill is too sick to accompany Georgie outside, so he helps him make the boat and sends him on his way. The boat ends up falling down a storm drain, much to Georgie's dismay. Georgie then encounters an evil clown monster (called "Pennywise") in the storm drain (who offers him a red balloon) and tells him about how people float down in the sewers. Pennywise offers Georgie his boat back, but when Georgie attempts to reach out to it, Pennywise grabs Georgie's arm and bites it off, leaving Georgie to bleed to death in the rain. In the theatrical film series, Georgie (instead of being left bleeding to death) is dragged down the sewers by the monster, after his arm is dismembered by the latter as he desperately tries to cling to his life calling Bill's name as no one hears.

Being used by Pennywise
Not long after his death, Georgie's appearance would be utilized by Pennywise to taunt and provoke Bill. While this aspect of the novel is not represented in the 1990 TV miniseries, Georgie appears to Bill several times throughout the theatrical film series.

Adaptations

1990 TV miniseries
Georgie Denbrough was portrayed by Tony Dakota in the 1990 TV miniseries adaptation. This iteration remains faithful to the source material, however, Georgie is killed by Pennywise off-screen.

Theatrical film series

Georgie Denbrough was portrayed by Jackson Robert Scott in the 2017 film adaptation of the King novel as well as its 2019 sequel. This adaptation of the character features the onscreen demise of Georgie as well as showing more of Pennywise using Georgie to affect Bill psychologically. Behind the scenes of the 2017 film, the young actor stated that he was not afraid of Bill Skarsgård as Pennywise and (in fact) formed a bond with the actor. Scott's performance as Georgie was acclaimed by fans and critics.

Death and controversy
The violent nature of Georgie's death (in the 2017 film adaptation of It) received a polarizing response from some critics. While most people felt that the graphic nature of Georgie's death was necessary to show the danger of Pennywise, some viewers felt that Pennywise ripping a child's arm off and watching Georgie attempt to crawl away was seen by some as being "downright disturbing" and "too graphic".

2019 short fan film
Georgie Denbrough is the main character of Georgie, a 2019 short fan film based on the 1990 TV miniseries adaptation of the novel, with Tony Dakota reprising his role as the title character. This short fan film shows an undead adult Georgie (being resurrected through drawing). This is the only adaptation to show Georgie as an adult.

Analysis
Throughout the novel and theatrical film series, Pennywise uses the "ghost of Georgie" to play on Bill's survivor's guilt. This is further explored in It Chapter Two (where Bill blames himself for Georgie's death), exemplified in a scene in which the adult Bill returns to the storm drain where Georgie was murdered. The scene progresses into a flashback where Pennywise's disembodied voice taunts Bill for not being present with Georgie when he died. The adult Bill struggles with post-traumatic stress disorder (due to Georgie's death) and attempts to prevent Pennywise from killing another young boy (to no avail). Georgie has also been seen as an interpretation of the way children are lured by predators, notably seen in Georgie's encounter with Pennywise at the storm drain.

In popular culture
The character has also been referenced many times in different forms of media. He is mentioned numerous times by American heavy metal and metallic hardcore band Ice Nine Kills in their 2019 song "It Is The End" (which is based upon and inspired by the 2017 film adaptation of the novel). The song is from the band's fifth studio album The Silver Scream (in which all the songs are inspired by horror films). The scene where Georgie meets Pennywise (in the 1990 TV miniseries adaptation of the novel) has become an internet meme depicting Pennywise attempting to coerce Georgie to come down to the sewers with different things. Georgie was also referenced in King's novel 11/22/63.

References

It (novel)
Stephen King characters
Child characters in film
Literary characters introduced in 1986
Fictional characters from Maine
Fictional child deaths
Fictional ghosts
Fictional murdered people
Film and television memes
Internet memes
Horror television characters